Dariusz Kozłowski (born 24 February 1968) is a Polish biathlete. He competed in the men's 20 km individual event at the 1992 Winter Olympics.

References

External links
 

1968 births
Living people
Polish male biathletes
Olympic biathletes of Poland
Biathletes at the 1992 Winter Olympics
People from Wałbrzych